Durgapur is a model railway station on the Bardhaman–Asansol section. It is located in Paschim Bardhaman district in the Indian state of West Bengal. It serves Durgapur, the third most populous city in West Bengal, and the surrounding industrial areas. It was ranked the third-cleanest railway station in India in 2019.

Overview
Mining-Industry Zone

"The entire belt between Durgapur (171 km [via Main Line] and 158 km [via Chord Line] from Howrah), and all the way up to Dhanbad and beyond is industrialized. Apart from factories, there are many coalmines, some closed now, and some with fires burning deep in the mineshafts.  The mining area extends for a large area, mostly to the south of the tracks. Quite a portion of the track passes through cuttings, where the surrounding area is higher than the track level, resulting in the profusion of characteristic small masonry bridges crossing the tracks." This description is from "Gomoh loco shed and CLW trip record" by Samit Roychoudhury.

History
The first passenger train in eastern India run from Howrah to Hooghly on 15 August 1854.  The track was extended to Raniganj by 1855.

Electrification
The Mankar–Waria sector was electrified in 1965–66.

Gallery

References

External links
Trains at Durgapur
 

Transport in Durgapur
Railway stations in Paschim Bardhaman district
Asansol railway division
Buildings and structures in Durgapur, West Bengal